Mohamed Al-Zinkawi (born 7 October 1953) is a Kuwaiti athlete. He competed in the men's shot put at the 1976, 1980 and the 1988 Summer Olympics.

References

External links
 

1953 births
Living people
Athletes (track and field) at the 1976 Summer Olympics
Athletes (track and field) at the 1980 Summer Olympics
Athletes (track and field) at the 1988 Summer Olympics
Kuwaiti male shot putters
Olympic athletes of Kuwait
Place of birth missing (living people)
Asian Games medalists in athletics (track and field)
Asian Games silver medalists for Kuwait
Asian Games bronze medalists for Kuwait
Athletes (track and field) at the 1978 Asian Games
Athletes (track and field) at the 1982 Asian Games
Medalists at the 1978 Asian Games
Medalists at the 1982 Asian Games
20th-century Kuwaiti people
21st-century Kuwaiti people